In geometry, an  trapezohedron, -trapezohedron, -antidipyramid, -antibipyramid, or -deltohedron is the dual polyhedron of an  antiprism. With a higher symmetry, its  faces are kites (also called deltoids).

The "" part of the name does not refer to faces here, but to two arrangements of each  vertices around an axis of  symmetry. The dual  antiprism has two actual  faces.

An  trapezohedron can be dissected into two equal  pyramids and an  antiprism.

Terminology
These figures, sometimes called deltohedra, must not be confused with deltahedra, whose faces are equilateral triangles.

Twisted trigonal, tetragonal, and hexagonal trapezohedra (with six, eight, and twelve twisted congruent kite faces) exist as crystals; in crystallography (describing the crystal habits of minerals), they are just called trigonal, tetragonal, and hexagonal trapezohedra. They have no plane of symmetry, and no center of inversion symmetry;, but they have a center of symmetry: the intersection point of their symmetry axes. The trigonal trapezohedron has one 3-fold symmetry axis, perpendicular to three 2-fold symmetry axes. The tetragonal trapezohedron has one 4-fold symmetry axis, perpendicular to four 2-fold symmetry axes of two kinds. The hexagonal trapezohedron has one 6-fold symmetry axis, perpendicular to six 2-fold symmetry axes of two kinds.

Crystal arrangements of atoms can repeat in space with trigonal and hexagonal trapezohedron cells.

Also in crystallography, the word trapezohedron is often used for the polyhedron with 24 congruent non-twisted kite faces properly known as a deltoidal icositetrahedron, which has eighteen order-4 vertices and eight order-3 vertices. This is not to be confused with the dodecagonal trapezohedron, which also has 24 congruent kite faces, but two order-12 apices (i.e. poles) and two rings of twelve order-3 vertices each.

Still in crystallography, the deltoid dodecahedron has 12 congruent non-twisted kite faces, six order-4 vertices and eight order-3 vertices (the rhombic dodecahedron is a special case). This is not to be confused with the hexagonal trapezohedron, which also has 12 congruent kite faces, but two order-6 apices (i.e. poles) and two rings of six order-3 vertices each.

Forms
An -trapezohedron is defined by a regular zig-zag skew -gon base, two symmetric apices with no degree of freedom right above and right below the base, and quadrilateral faces connecting each pair of adjacent basal edges to one apex.

An -trapezohedron has two apical vertices on its polar axis, and  basal vertices in two regular -gonal rings. It has  congruent kite faces, and it is isohedral.

Special cases:
 . A degenerate form of trapezohedron: a geometric tetrahedron with 6 vertices, 8 edges, and 4 degenerate kite faces that are degenerated into triangles. Its dual is a degenerate form of antiprism: also a tetrahedron.

 . The dual of a triangular antiprism: the kites are rhombi (or squares); hence these trapezohedra are also zonohedra. They are called rhombohedra. They are cubes scaled in the direction of a body diagonal. They are also the parallelepipeds with congruent rhombic faces.
It can be decomposed into two equal regular tetrahedra and a regular octahedron. Since parallelepipeds can fill space, so can a combination of regular tetrahedra and regular octahedra.

 . The pentagonal trapezohedron is the only polyhedron other than the Platonic solids commonly used as a die in roleplaying games such as Dungeons & Dragons. Being convex and face-transitive, it makes fair dice. Having 10 sides, it can be used in repetition to generate any decimal-based uniform probability desired.

Symmetry

One degree of freedom within symmetry from Dnd (order 4n) to Dn (order 2n) changes the congruent kites into congruent quadrilaterals with three edge lengths, called twisted kites, and the n-trapezohedron is called a twisted trapezohedron. (In the limit, one edge of each quadrilateral goes to zero length, and the n-trapezohedron becomes an n-bipyramid.)

If the kites surrounding the two peaks are not twisted but are of two different shapes, the n-trapezohedron can only have Cnv (cyclic with vertical mirrors) symmetry, order 2n, and is called an unequal or asymmetric trapezohedron. Its dual is an unequal n-antiprism, with the top and bottom n-gons of different radii.

If the kites are twisted and are of two different shapes, the n-trapezohedron can only have Cn (cyclic) symmetry, order n, and is called an unequal twisted trapezohedron.

Star trapezohedron
A star -trapezohedron (where ) is defined by a regular zig-zag skew star -gon base, two symmetric apices with no degree of freedom right above and right below the base, and quadrilateral faces connecting each pair of adjacent basal edges to one apex.

A star -trapezohedron has two apical vertices on its polar axis, and  basal vertices in two regular -gonal rings. It has  congruent kite faces, and it is isohedral.

Such a star -trapezohedron is a self-intersecting, crossed, or non-convex form. It exists for any regular zig-zag skew star -gon base (where ).

But if , then , so the dual star antiprism (of the star trapezohedron) cannot be uniform (i.e. cannot have equal edge lengths); and if , then , so the dual star antiprism must be flat, thus degenerate, to be uniform.

A dual-uniform star -trapezohedron has Coxeter-Dynkin diagram .

See also

Diminished trapezohedron
Rhombic dodecahedron
Rhombic triacontahedron
Bipyramid
Truncated trapezohedron
Conway polyhedron notation
The Haunter of the Dark, a short story by H.P. Lovecraft in which a fictional ancient artifact known as The Shining Trapezohedron plays a crucial role.

References

 Chapter 4: Duals of the Archimedean polyhedra, prisma and antiprisms

External links

Virtual Reality Polyhedra The Encyclopedia of Polyhedra
VRML models (George Hart) <3> <4> <5> <6> <7> <8> <9> <10>
Conway Notation for Polyhedra Try: "dAn", where n=3,4,5... Example: "dA5" is a pentagonal trapezohedron.
Paper model tetragonal (square) trapezohedron

Polyhedra

fr:Antidiamant